Aix-Villemaur-Palis is a commune in the Aube department of northeastern France. The municipality was established on 1 January 2016 and consists of the former communes of Aix-en-Othe, Villemaur-sur-Vanne and Pâlis.

Population

See also 
Communes of the Aube department

References 

Communes of Aube
Populated places established in 2016
2016 establishments in France